Fábio Miguel Malheiro Paím (born 15 February 1988) is a Portuguese former professional footballer who played as a winger.

After starting out at Sporting CP, he went on to play for a host of clubs in a variety of countries, without settling anywhere.

Club career
Born in Estoril, Lisbon District, Paím was once regarded as the most promising young player in Portugal by Cristiano Ronaldo, who said upon arriving at Manchester United: "If you think I'm good, just wait until you see Fábio Paím". He joined Sporting CP's youth system at the age of 9, before making his professional debut in 2007 on loan at C.D. Olivais e Moscavide alongside Sporting teammate Bruno Pereirinha. He spent the 2007–08 season with two teams, making his Primeira Liga debut with F.C. Paços de Ferreira after starting with C.D. Trofense in the Segunda Liga.

Paím moved to Luiz Felipe Scolari's Chelsea in August 2008, but only appeared for their reserves during a four-month spell. On 11 December he left the English club and moved, yet again on loan, to Rio Ave FC. Coach Carlos Brito decided not to keep him mainly due to his high salary, and the player did not manage to attract any interest before the end of winter transfer window, spending the rest of the campaign unattached.

On 25 September 2009, both Sporting and Real S.C. – which had Filipe Ramos, a former Sporting player, as a coach, with the side competing in the third tier – agreed to a one-year loan deal until the end of 2009–10, making Paím the ninth Sporting player loaned out to that team. In the 2010 off-season, without any official appearances to his credit, the 22-year-old left the Estádio José Alvalade for good, signing with S.C.U. Torreense of the same league. He left after only a couple of months, spending the following years in Angola with C.D. Primeiro de Agosto and S.L. Benfica (Luanda).

Paím joined C.F. Benfica of the Portuguese third division for the 2012–13 season. After some months trying to regain match fitness, he made his official debut against C.D. Mafra; in December 2012, however, he moved teams and countries again, penning a two-year deal with Al Kharaitiyat SC of the Qatar Stars League.

On 19 August 2014, Paím signed a two-year contract for Mosta F.C. in the Maltese Premier League. In April of the following year, he joined FK Nevėžis in Lithuania.

In the summer of 2015, Paím moved to Union 05 Kayl-Tétange in Luxembourg's division two. He was dismissed from the team in September, for "unprofessional behavior".

On 10 November 2017, after a fleeting spell in Brazilian amateur football, Paím signed with the reserves of Leixões S.C. in the Porto Football Association.

International career
Paím won 42 caps for Portugal across all youth levels, scoring seven goals. Of Angolan descent as his parents hailed from Huambo Province, he was eligible to represent its senior team and hoped to be selected to the 2012 Africa Cup of Nations, but ultimately was not called.

Paím's only appearance for the Portuguese under-21s was on 14 October 2008, when he came on as a 69th-minute substitute for Daniel Candeias in a 1–0 friendly loss to Ukraine held in Vila Nova de Gaia.

Personal life
In August 2019, Paím was arrested by the Public Security Police after an undetermined amount of illegal drugs was found in his possession in Estoril. He was eventually acquitted, on the grounds that wire tapping was not admissible evidence in a court of law.

Honours
Trofense
 Segunda Liga: 2007–08

References

External links
 
 
 
 

1988 births
Living people
Sportspeople from Cascais
Portuguese sportspeople of Angolan descent
Portuguese footballers
Association football wingers
Primeira Liga players
Liga Portugal 2 players
Segunda Divisão players
Sporting CP footballers
C.D. Olivais e Moscavide players
C.D. Trofense players
F.C. Paços de Ferreira players
Rio Ave F.C. players
Real S.C. players
S.C.U. Torreense players
AD Oliveirense players
Chelsea F.C. players
Girabola players
C.D. Primeiro de Agosto players
S.L. Benfica (Luanda) players
Al Kharaitiyat SC players
Maltese Premier League players
Mosta F.C. players
I Lyga players
FK Nevėžis players
Portugal youth international footballers
Portugal under-21 international footballers
Portuguese expatriate footballers
Expatriate footballers in England
Expatriate footballers in Angola
Expatriate footballers in Qatar
Expatriate footballers in Malta
Expatriate footballers in Lithuania
Expatriate footballers in Luxembourg
Expatriate footballers in Brazil
Portuguese expatriate sportspeople in England
Portuguese expatriate sportspeople in Angola
Portuguese expatriate sportspeople in Qatar
Portuguese expatriate sportspeople in Malta
Portuguese expatriate sportspeople in Lithuania
Portuguese expatriate sportspeople in Luxembourg
Portuguese expatriate sportspeople in Brazil